Elite Airways is an airline based in the United States operating charter and scheduled passenger flights. The airline adjusts destinations as demand increases or decreases.  The airline is headquartered in Portland, Maine.

History
Elite Airways LLC was founded in 2006 and received FAA Part 121 scheduled certification in 2012. When the airline obtained its scheduled authority it announced it would begin scheduled passenger flights to and from Melbourne Orlando International Airport, the airline's operating base; the first scheduled passenger route was announced on July 28, 2014, when the airline said it would begin twice-weekly services between Melbourne and Washington Dulles International Airport on September 8 that year. Flights went on sale August 25, 2014 utilizing Branson Air Express as the ticketing airline. In November the airline began operating the Branson Air Express flights from Branson Airport to Chicago Midway Airport and Houston Hobby Airport.

The airline announced that service from Northern Colorado's Fort Collins-Loveland Airport to both Newark Liberty International Airport and Chicago Rockford International Airport would begin on August 27, 2015. The airline subsequently announced flights starting December 10, 2015 from Vero Beach Municipal Airport to Newark Liberty International Airport, representing the first-ever commercial scheduled jet service at Vero Beach airport.

In early 2016, Elite Airways introduced scheduled service from Naples Municipal Airport in southwest Florida to Newark Liberty, Melbourne Orlando, Vero Beach and Portland International Jetport in Maine, representing the first commercial services at Naples Municipal Airport since 2006. In March 2016, the airline announced the restart of twice-weekly service between Fort Collins-Loveland Municipal Airport and Chicago Rockford International Airport starting May 23, 2016. On April 15, 2016, the airline announced that it would begin regular flight operations at Long Island MacArthur Airport in Islip, New York. The airline announced service to three destinations: Orlando-Melbourne, Florida; Myrtle Beach, South Carolina; and Portland, Maine. Flight service began at Long Island MacArthur Airport the morning of June 17, 2016 On December 7, 2016, the airline announced it would begin non-stop service from Long Island to Newport News, Virginia beginning in March 2017, and on December 13, 2016, the airline announced plans to further expand service from Long Island MacArthur Airport to Vero Beach, FL.

Beginning April 27, 2017, Elite Airways begins its first international service, flying between Melbourne Orlando International Airport and South Bimini Airport in The Bahamas.

Beginning September 28, 2017, Elite Airways began doing business as Cal Jet Elite, and flew between McClellan-Palomar Airport in Carlsbad, California and McCarran International Airport in Las Vegas, Nevada. Cal Jet and Elite provided irregular service, frequently canceling flights and stranding travelers. The service was quietly ceased by the airline in April 2018, and Elite Airways has not made an announcement on whether or not to maintain the Cal Jet route. As of June 20, it is not possible to book flights on the official website.

In 2018 the airline refocused its scheduled operations on the core Newark & Portland to Florida flights and has since added flights from Florida to Asheville, North Carolina and Traverse City, Michigan.

On August 6, 2019, it was announced that Elite Airways signed an operating agreement to provide the initial aircraft, flight crews, and maintenance service for the revival of the Midwest Express brand. On September 18, 2022, BizTimes.com reported that Midwest Express had terminated the agreement and was bringing suit.

In 2019, Elite Airways opened a dedicated maintenance facility at Auburn/Lewiston Municipal Airport. In 2019 Elite Airways also ceased scheduled service to Melbourne-Orlando, which it had served since it began scheduled passenger service.

In 2020, Vero Beach, Florida city council recommended terminating Elite's lease at Vero Beach Regional Airport due to a funding gap from Florida Department of Transportation as Elite's passenger's numbers had exceeded 10,000 but less than 200,000. The city council ultimately extended the lease while trying to work out a longer-term solution.

In 2021, Elite begins building its operations at Westchester County Airport by adding new destinations like the islands of Martha's Vineyard and Nantucket located south of Cape Cod, and later adding routes to its destinations in Florida and Maine. In Martha's Vineyard it is the first carrier to operate jet service to Westchester County Airport. Nantucket Memorial Airport has had jet service to Westchester County Airport from JetBlue since 2019. Cape Air has also flown to both islands from Westchester County Airport since 2011, but it is using nine seat piston engine aircraft.
Beginning November 2021, Elite will operate flights twice weekly between Newark, New Jersey and St. Augustine (Florida) Regional Airport.

According to VeroNews.com as of July 14, 2022, the carrier had cancelled all of its scheduled July service at Vero Beach in addition to 27 of the 35 flights for June, due to the expiration of a TSA waiver.

According to multiple posts on the site airlinepilotforums.com, as of August 2022 the company was well in arrears for payroll and hangar lease. On September 14, 2022, their website claims the reservation system is down for maintenance.

Elite Airways was listed as inactive as a business from September 23rd 2022.  It's last flights took place in the Summer 2022 and the airline is considered to have ceased operations.

Fleet
The Elite Airways fleet comprises the following aircraft:
As of July 2021, Elite Airways fleet is:

Destinations
Elite Airways operates both charter and scheduled operations.
Charter operations are primarily NCAA charters, music tours, and other ACMI operations flying throughout North & Central America, and the Caribbean.

The scheduled operations served are listed below:

Current destinations

Terminated destinations

References

External links
Elite Airways official website
PlaneSpotters.net official website

Airlines established in 2012
Airlines based in Maine
Companies based in Portland, Maine